Revelli might refer to:

Guns 
Fiat–Revelli Modello 1914, Italian machine gun
Fiat–Revelli Modello 1935, Italian machine gun

People 
Filippo Antonio Revelli (1716–1801), Italian mathematician
Hervé Revelli (born 1946), French football player and manager
Maurice Revelli (born 1964), Monegasque footballer
Nuto Revelli (1919–2004), Italian essayist and partisan
Patrick Revelli (born 1951), French footballer
Paolo Revelli (born 1959), Italian swimmer
Romain Revelli (born 1977), French football player and manager
William Revelli (1902–1994), American music educator and conductor